Marks & Spencer Financial Services plc, trading as M&S Bank, is a retail bank operating in the United Kingdom. It was originally formed as the financial services division of the British retailer Marks & Spencer in 1985 and adopted its current name in 2012.

Initially focused on providing credit through in-house store cards, the bank now provides a range of products to personal customers including credit cards, loans, savings, insurance and foreign currency exchange.

M&S Bank is operated as a joint-venture with HSBC and has been a wholly owned subsidiary of the latter since its sale in November 2004. The bank retains its own banking licence and board and continues to occupy its purpose-built headquarters in Chester.

The bank is authorised by the Prudential Regulation Authority and regulated by both the Financial Conduct Authority and the Prudential Regulation Authority. It subscribes to the Lending Code.

History
The bank was launched by Marks and Spencer as St Michael Financial Services in 1985, using the company's then main house brand. It initially specialised in operating its 'Chargecard' store card, before moving on to launch other credit offerings over the following few years.

The company was renamed Marks & Spencer Financial Services in 1988, and Marks and Spencer Unit Trust Management was established to provide unit trust funds the same year. In 1989, personal loans were introduced, followed by interest-free loans for M&S furniture purchases in 1991.

A rebranding as M&S Money took place in 2003 and the product range was expanded with the launch of the '&More' credit card. A combination of new customers and conversion of former Chargecard holders secured a base of 2.1 million cardholders by the end of March 2004, making the company a top ten credit card issuer within the UK.

During 2004, as part of an effort to reduce costs and return money to shareholders, Marks & Spencer reached an agreement to sell the company to HSBC for £580 million. Under the terms of the sale, it was agreed that M&S and HSBC would share profits from M&S Money until at least 2019.

In 2019, the bank began its sponsorship of the M&S Bank Arena, a major events venue in nearby Liverpool.

M&S Bank was reported as having between 3 and 4 million customers in early 2021.

Products and services
M&S Bank provides a range of financial services to personal customers. Many have features designed to appeal specifically to Marks and Spencer customers.

Products are sold and serviced primarily online and by telephone, with additional marketing activity carried out through Marks and Spencer's stores and website. The bank also operated a small number of in-store branches between 2012 and 2021.

Credit Cards

M&S Bank entered the credit card market in 2003 and offers various Mastercard-branded cards. Cards feature an 'M&S Points' loyalty scheme which rewards spending with Marks and Spencer vouchers and offers. An additional 'Club Rewards' option gives extra loyalty points and vouchers in return for a monthly membership fee, along with additional benefits when shopping at Marks & Spencer such as free delivery of online orders and in-store hot drinks.

Sparks Pay

Launched in the autumn of 2022, Sparks Pay is a dedicated credit product for Marks & Spencer customers. It offers instant credit of up to £500 to spend on the M&S website and app, with up to 45 days interest free.

Loans

Personal loans were introduced in 1989 and loans of up to £25,000 are available.

Insurance

The bank sells a selection of insurance products underwritten by various providers including:

 Home insurance - Aviva
 Car insurance - BISL
 Travel insurance - Aviva
 Pet insurance - RSA
 Life insurance - HSBC Life

Bureaux de change

Over 100 bureaux de change are available in Marks and Spencer stores across the UK, offering facilities to sell and buy up to 40 currencies. The bank also offers a click and collect money service allowing Euro and US Dollars to be ordered online and collected from most other Marks and Spencer stores.

Purchases of currency made using an M&S Bank credit card are interest-free for up to 55 days and do not attract the cash advance fee usually levied by credit cards.

Former products

Store cards

The bank's first products were the Budgetcard and Chargecard store cards. These allowed customers to make 'buy now, pay later' purchases in Marks and Spencer stores, which did not accept mainstream credit cards until April 2000. Chargecard received 270,000 applications within three weeks of its launch in 1985 and by 1999 was claimed to be the country's biggest store card scheme with over 6 million cardholders.

From October 2003 onwards, around 2.6 million customers were offered a new Mastercard credit card to replace their existing Chargecard, leading to 1.7 million customers migrating to the new product. The Budgetcard was withdrawn from sale for new customers in 2005, followed by the Chargecard in 2011.

Current accounts

A paid-for Premium Current Account featuring benefits tailored to regular Marks and Spencer customers was launched during 2012, followed in 2014 by a standard current account offering the typical free in-credit banking commonplace in the UK.

On 4 March 2021, M&S Bank announced that it would discontinue its current account sales and close all current accounts by August 2021. Press reports suggested that only 150,000 of the bank's customers were current account holders and that the company intended to focus instead on core products such as credit cards and  loans, along with new digital payment solutions.

Mortgages

A range of mortgages was introduced in 2018, but signup of new customers ceased in 2020 as part of the bank's response to the COVID-19 pandemic, and there are no plans to re-enter the market.

References

External links

MandS Money
Marks & Spencer
Banks of the United Kingdom
British companies established in 1985
Banks established in 1985